Ammerman is a surname. Notable people with the surname include:

Celia Ammerman (born 1983), American fashion model
Joseph S. Ammerman (1924–1993), American politician
Nancy Ammerman (born 1950), American sociologist
Robert W. Ammerman (1841–1907), American soldier and Medal of Honor recipient

See also
Ammermann